Alfonso Ugarte de Chiclín is a Peruvian football club, playing in the city of Trujillo, Peru.

The club is the biggest of Trujillo city, and one of the biggest in La Libertad Province.

The club were founded 1 August 1917 and play in the Copa Perú which is the third division of the Peruvian league.

The club has a long rivalry with Carlos A. Mannucci, and matches between the two teams are known as "Classic Trujillano".

History

Foundation
On August 1, 1917, was based on Alfonso Ugarte Club at Hacienda Chiclín near Trujillo. No one so far foretold that this small team would eventually star in a story in the Peruvian amateur football. With the passing of the years his success was made winning the sympathy and commitment of its people.

The Tour
In 1933 he presented for the first time in Lima falling to University at the National Stadium. During that decade played several friendlies against teams Peruvian capital from abroad in 1936 and faced the Argentine team Gimnasia Citadel, in which he lost 3-2. The following year, tied at four goals with Audax Italiano of Chile and defeated 3-2 at San Cristobal de Brazil team that had to beat Alianza Lima and Universitario.

The Red Devils nickname he earned when the September 23, 1942, 2-1 defeated Independiente de Avellaneda, at that time champion Argentina in a friendly played in Trujillo

The club was 1967 Copa Perú champion, when defeated Juan Aurich, FBC Melgar, Cienciano, and Colegio Nacional Iquitos.

The club have played at the highest level of Peruvian football on two occasions, from 1966 Torneo Descentralizado until 1967 Torneo Descentralizado when was relegated.

Honours

National
Copa Perú:
Winners (1): 1967

Regional
Liga Departamental de La Libertad:
Winners (4): 1968, 1970, 1989, 1990
Runner-up (3): 1971, 2017

Liga Provincial de Trujillo:
Winners (5): 1978, 1981, 1989, 1995, 2017

Liga Distrital de Trujillo:
Winners (16): 1948, 1958, 1959, 1960, 1964, 1965, 1968, 1969, 1970, 1971, 1975, 1978, 1981, 1995, 2017
Runner-up (3): 1977, 1980, 2019

See also
List of football clubs in Peru
Peruvian football league system

Football clubs in Peru
Association football clubs established in 1917
1917 establishments in Peru